The 2022–23 FA Youth Cup was the 71st edition of the FA Youth Cup.

The competition consisted of several rounds and was preceded by a qualifying competition, starting with two preliminary rounds which is followed by 3 qualifying rounds for non-League teams. Football League teams enter the draw thereafter, with League One and League Two teams entered at the first round proper, and Premier League and Championship teams entered at the third round proper.

622 teams were accepted into the FA Youth Cup.  The competition was previously won by Manchester United who defeated Nottingham Forest 3–1 in front of a record crowd of 67,492 at Old Trafford on May 11, 2022.

Calendar

Qualifying rounds

Extra preliminary round
120 teams took part in the Extra Preliminary round. 11 teams withdrew from the tournament in this phase and as a result 11 walkovers occurred this round. The draw for the round took place on July 8, 2022.

Preliminary round
448 teams took part in the preliminary round with 60 teams having progressed from the previous round along with 388 new teams participating in this round. 30 teams withdrew from the competition resulting in Walkovers, while Woodford Town was removed from the Tournament on appeal for using an ineligible player. The draw for the round took place on July 8, 2022.

First round qualifying
224 teams took part in the first round Qualifying Phase with the all winners from the previous round participating. There were two walkovers in this round and two Teams were removed from the competition. South Park and Tilbury withdrew from the Competition. Reading City was removed from the competition for fielding an ineligible player. and Lancaster City was removed for an unknown appeal. The Draw for this round took place on September 2, 2022. There were 28 teams from the Tenth Tier in the football pyramid as the lowest remaining teams in the competition.

Second round qualifying
136 teams took part in the second round Qualifying Phase, with all the winners from the previous round and 24 teams from the National League being added for this round. The lowest level teams remaining in the competition are AEK Boco, AFC Blackpool, Andover Town,  Buckingham Athletic, Clifton All Whites, Corby Town,  Langley,  Lutterworth Athletic, Northampton ON Chenecks, St Margaretsbury,  Wythenshawe Amateurs from Level 10 of the football pyramid.

Third round qualifying
68 teams took part in the third round Qualifying Phase, with all the winners from the previous round participating. The lowest level teams remaining in the competition are AFC Blackpool, Andover Town,  Buckingham Athletic,  Langley,  Lutterworth Athletic, Northampton ON Chenecks,  Wythenshawe Amateurs from Level 10 of the football pyramid.

Competition Proper

First round
46 League One and League Two teams enter the first round proper with the 34 non league winners from the qualifying rounds joining them for this round. Only Wycombe Wanderers and Crawley Town did not participate in the first round as they did not apply.  Salford City and Barrow were originally drawn, but Barrow withdrew from the first round so Salford City won 3–0 on a walkover. The lowest remaining teams in the competition were  Northampton ON Chenecks and Wythenshawe Amateurs from level 10.

Second round
40 teams play this round with all the winners from the previous round participating. The lowest team remaining in the competition is  Horndean from level 9.

Third round
64 teams compete in the third round with the 44 Premier League and EFL Championship Clubs appearing this round along with the 20 winners from the previous round. The lowest team remaining in the competition is Dover Athletic from the National League South.

Fourth round
32 teams participate in the fourth round proper with all 32 winners from the previous round participating.The draw for the fourth round was made on 9 December 2022.The lowest level team remaining in the competition is AFC Wimbledon from League Two.

Fifth round
16 teams participate in the fifth round proper with all 16 winners from the previous round participating. The Fifth Round draw was made on January 13, 2023. The lowest level teams remaining in the competition are Cambridge United,  Fleetwood Town, Ipswich Town,  Oxford United and Sheffield Wednesday from League One. The matches will be played before February 11, 2023, with the exception of the Oxford United match.

Quarter-finals
Eight teams participate in the quarter-finals with all eight winners from the previous round participating.The Draw for the quarter finals was made on February 3, 2023. The lowest remaining teams are  Cambridge United, Ipswich Town, and  Oxford United from League One.

Semi-finals
Four teams participate in the semi-finals with all four winners from the previous round participating. The draw was made on February 24, 2023. The matches have to be played before April 8, 2023.

Final
The winners of the semi-finals play this match to determine the winner of the FA Youth Cup. The draw for whoever makes the final was made on February 24, 2023. The match will be played before April 29, 2023 unless stated otherwise.

References

External links
 The FA Youth Cup at The Football Association official website

FA Youth Cup seasons
Cup